The 1954 Carrera Panamericana was the fifth and final running of the Carrera Panamericana Mexican sports car racing event, run from November 19–23, 1954. It was the sixth and final race of the 1954 World Sportscar Championship. The race was won by Umberto Maglioli in an Erwin Goldschmidt-entered Ferrari 375 Plus. He finished the race in 17 hours, 40 minutes, and 26 seconds, averaging .

Pre-race

The Sports classes were divided as before, over and under . This was in order to accommodate the huge number of participants and the diverse breeds of cars within the race.

Going into the race, Ferrari had already won the championship, but victory would ensure the marque would score maximum points for the season. Although no works entries were sent from Italy, there was a number of top quality entrants from both Mexico and the United States, hoping the get that victory on behalf of the Maranello concern.

Heading into the event, pressure was mounting on Mexican government, as the annual death toll from the event caused the country to be shown in a negative light. This wasn't the kind of attention the locals wanted. It had been abundantly clear the days were numbered for the Carrera Panamericana. 1954 would be the last time the event was run in this format, although it did return as a revival event in 1988.

Race

The race was won overall by Umberto Maglioli in a Ferrari 375 Plus. Phil Hill and Richie Ginther took second place in another Ferrari, over 24 minutes behind. The under-1500 sports car class winner Hans Herrmann finished third in his Porsche 550, closely followed by Jaroslav Juhan in his Porsche 550 Spyder, a further 87 minutes behind the Americans. Ray Crawford and Enrique Iglesias won the over-3500 stock car class in a Lincoln, the European stock car class was won by Consalvo Sanesi and Giuseppe Cagna in an Alfa Romeo, and the small U.S. stock car class was won by Tommy Drisdale and Walter Krause, Jr. in a Dodge.

A number of the sedans from the US failed to make it through the first stage of the race. The Austin-Healey 100S of Englishman, Lance Macklin struggled from ignition troubles and retired before completing the first stage. The Ferrari 375 Plus of Jack McAfee and Ford Robinson had an accident that provided the first fatality, with the death of Robinson. Sadly, there would be fatality, when Leopoldo Olvera Zabado died following an accident on the fifth stage.

The Californian pairing of Hill and Ginther continued to look impressive, making it through the second stage in their Allen Guiberson-entered Ferrari 375 MM without incident and remaining close to the front of the overall standing. However, another American was not going so well: Carroll Shelby suffered an accident while driving his Austin-Healey 100S. Frustrated with his team-mate, Ray Jackson-Moore's slow pace, Shelby supposedly removed Jackson-Moore’s seat and took off on his own.

As the event progressed, the list of cars remaining grew shorter and shorter. Many of the strong competitors were either out of the race, or behind the leading Ferraris of Maglioli and Hill/Ginther. The two Americans continued to chase hard to rein in solo-driving Maglioli. It was a 375 MM spyder chasing after a 375 Plus, with still a long way to go before anyone could celebrate. After  there was very little time separating the two cars.

Despite feeling the pressure, Maglioli  strengthened his grip and did not make any mistakes in the closing stages of the race, finishing nearly 25 minutes ahead of Hill and Ginther.

Californian hot rodder Ak Miller became famous by finishing seventh overall, in his Oldsmobile-powered 1927 Ford.

Only months after its introduction in Mexico, the local distributor entered seven Volkswagen Beetles in order to prove their reliability and to make the car known. As they were using standard Volkswagen engines, the cars were driving bumper-to-bumper in order reduce air resistance as available power was limited. By the time the event got to Ciudad Juárez, all seven Beetles were still within the given time limit, none was disqualified, with Alfonso de Hohenlohe and Alberto Álvarez coming home in 78th place overall (7th in class), albeit, the Beetles filled seven of the last eight finishing positions.

Official Classification

Results

Class winners are marked in bold.

Class Winners

Standings after the race

References

Further reading

John Pickworth. Carrera Panamericana. John Morton Pickworth. .
Daryl E. Murphy. Carrera Panamericana: History of the Mexican Prad Race, 1950-54. iUniverse, Inc.  
Johnny Tipler. La Carrera Panamericana: The World’s Greatest Road Race. Authors Online Ltd. 

Carrera Panamericana
Carrera Panamericana
Carrera Panamericana
November 1954 sports events in Mexico